Scopula vacuata is a moth of the  family Geometridae. It is found on Borneo. The habitat consists of lowland forests but it can occur as high as 1,000 metres in the lower montane forest zone. The species is often found in softwood plantations and secondary forests in lowland Sabah.

Adults are straw-coloured with a fawn forewing discal mark.

References

Moths described in 1857
vacuata
Moths of Asia